Ê, ê (e-circumflex) is a letter of the Latin alphabet, found in Afrikaans,  French, Friulian, Kurdish, Norwegian (Nynorsk), Portuguese, Vietnamese, and Welsh.  It is used to transliterate Chinese, Persian, and Ukrainian.

Usage in various languages

Afrikaans
Ê is not considered a separate letter in Afrikaans but a variation of "E". The circumflex changes the pronunciation of "e" to be  (or  if the succeeding consonant is either a dorsal or a liquid)

Chinese
In the Pinyin romanization of Standard Mandarin Chinese, ê represents . It corresponds to Zhuyin ㄝ. The circumflex occurs only if ê is the only letter in the syllable: ề  ("eh!"). Without the circumflex, e as, the only letter in the syllable, represents : è   ("hungry"). Elsewhere,  is written as a (before n) or e (at the end of a syllable), with the appropriate tone mark,: xiān  ("first"), xuǎn  ("to choose"), xué  ("to learn"), xièxie  ("thanks").

In Pe̍h-ōe-jī, ê is the fifth tone of e: ê (possessive, adjectival suffix).

French
Diacritics are not considered to be distinct letters of the French alphabet. In French, ê changes the pronunciation of e from /ə/ to /ɛ/. It is used instead of "è" for words that used to be written "es".

Friulian

Italian

Khmer

Kurdish
Ê is the 7th letter of the Kurdish Kurmanji alphabet and represents /eː/.

Norwegian Nynorsk 
In Nynorsk, ê is used to represent the reduction of the Old Norse sequence <eð>, similar to the use of ê for the historical sequence <es> in French. It is mostly used to differenciate words which would be spelled the same without the diacritic, e.g. vêr 'weather' and ver, imperative of 'to be'.

Persian
Ê is used in the Persian Latin (Rumi) alphabet, equivalent to ع.

Portuguese
In Portuguese, ê marks a stressed  only in words whose stressed syllable is in an otherwise unpredictable location in the word: "pêssego" (peach). The letter, pronounced , can also contrast with é, pronounced , as in pé (foot).

Tibetan
Ê is used in Tibetan pinyin to represent , for example Gêrzê County.

Ukrainian
Ê is used in the ISO 9:1995 system of Ukrainian transliteration as the letter Є.

Vietnamese
Ê is the 9th letter of the Vietnamese alphabet and represents . In Vietnamese phonology, diacritics can be added to form five forms to represent five tones of ê:

 Ề ề
 Ể ể
 Ễ ễ
 Ế ế
 Ệ ệ

Welsh
In Welsh, ê represents long stressed e  if the vowel would otherwise be pronounced as short : llên  "literature", as opposed to llen  "curtain", or gêm  "game", as opposed to gem  "gem, jewel". That is useful for borrowed words with a final stress like apêl  "appeal".

Other
In Popido, a fictitious dialect of Esperanto made by Manuel Halvelik for use in literature, ê represents . It is only used epenthetically to break consonant clusters, especially before grammatical suffixes.

Character mappings
Unicode encoded 5 pairs of precomposed characters (Ề / ề, Ể / ể, Ễ / ễ, Ế / ế, Ệ / ệ) for the five tones of ê in Vietnamese. Two pairs of the five (Ế / ế and Ề / ề) can also be used as the second and fourth tones of ê in Pinyin. The first and third tones of ê in Pinyin have to be represented by combining diacritical marks, like ê̄ (ê&#772;) and ê̌ (ê&#780;).

See also
 Circumflex

References

E-circumflex